Prunus arabica is a species of wild almond found across the Middle East. It is a broomlike shrub typically 0.75 to 2m tall, with brown bark. Its leaves have a 5-8 mm petiole and the leaf blades are 15 to 44 mm long and 3 to 10 mm wide. Its inflorescences have dark red hypanthia and sepals (green on the interior of the sepals), and white, pale pink or pink petals. The flowers are borne on a pedicel about 3 mm long, which lengthens to 6 mm when the fruit is fully developed.

It prefers to grow in arid or semiarid areas at 500 to 2700m above sea level. A full genetic and morphological analysis suggests that Prunus scoparia may be conspecific with it; certainly it is its closest relative. It is occasionally cultivated for erosion control, as its brushy growth form makes a good windbreak.

References

External links
 
 

arabica
Plants described in 1960
Flora of Western Asia
Flora of the Arabian Peninsula